Lorimer Rich  (December 24, 1891 – June 2, 1978)  was an American architect, born in Camden, New York.  He is now best remembered for collaborating with sculptor Thomas Hudson Jones on the winning entry in a nationwide competition to create a design for the Tomb of the Unknown Soldier  in Arlington National Cemetery.
Rich graduated from Syracuse University in 1914.  This was followed by further studies in Europe, a standard move for many young American architects of that era.  Shortly thereafter he joined the US Army and served in World War I.  Upon returning to the United States he worked for the prestigious architectural firm McKim, Mead and White. In 1928 he established his own New York City firm.

There he gained a reputation as a designer of post offices.

Rich returned to Camden after retiring from practice and died there in 1978. He was buried in Arlington National Cemetery with his wife Martha Ross Leigh (1894–1987) not far from the Tomb of the Unknown.

Commissions
 Second Corps Area Headquarters – Pershing Hall, Fort Jay, Governors Island, New York, 1934.
 Great Barrington Main Post Office, Great Barrington, Massachusetts, 1935
 Flatbush Sub-station of the Brooklyn Post Office,  1935
 Station "A",  Brooklyn Post Office  1935
 Kensington Post Office, 1935
 Morris Heights Post Office, Bronx, New York
 Madison Square Branch, Post Office  1937
 Forest Hills Post Office, 1937
 Johnstown Post Office – Johnstown, Pennsylvania, 1938
 Joe and Emily Lowe Gallery, Syracuse University,  1952
 Archibold Gymnasium, additions to, Syracuse University,  1952
 Women's Building,  Syracuse University,  1953
 Ernest I White Law College, Syracuse, university,  1954
 "and various dormitories" at Syracuse University 
 New York State Insurance Fund Building, 199 Church Street, New York City, 1955
 Rich Hall of the State University of New York at Oswego named after Grace Ellingwood Rich, the sister of Lorimer Rich
 Camden United Methodist Church, 132 Main Street, Camden New York 1969
 Tomb of the Unknown Soldiers of the American Revolution, 201 North James Street, Rome New York 1976

References

1891 births
1978 deaths
20th-century American architects
Syracuse University alumni
Burials at Arlington National Cemetery